Raheem Josan Isaiah Robinson (born 30 July 1992) is a Caymanian footballer who plays as a forward. He has represented the Cayman Islands during World Cup qualifying matches in 2011.

References

Association football forwards
Living people
1992 births
Caymanian footballers
Cayman Islands international footballers
Cayman Athletic SC players